Roomies is an American sitcom television series created by Sy Rosen, that aired on NBC from March 19 until May 15, 1987. Reruns of the series later aired on Saturday mornings in 1991.

Plot
The series centered on Nick Chase, a 42-year old former drill instructor who has retired from the U.S. Marine Corps and is now taking advantage of the GI Bill to attend Saginaw University. He gets assigned to room with Matthew Wiggins, 14-year old "boy genius", who has also enrolled at Saginaw to study marine biology. Nick does not like this arrangement at first, but when he sees Matthew is serious about his studies, he appreciates avoiding the stereotypical raunchiness and zaniness associated with college students and sees the same discipline in Matthew that he saw in his recruits, and the two form a partnership, trying to help each other out. Among those shown were a trio of 'Singing Freshman' who sang through the hallways.

Trivia
Burt Young himself served in the U. S. Marine Corps from 1957 to 1959.

Cast
Burt Young as Nick Chase
Corey Haim as Matthew Wiggins
Sean Gregory Sullivan as Carl
Jane Daly as Ms. Adler
Joshua Nelson as Sheldon
Michael Lesca as singing freshman
Robert Rheames as singing freshman
Larry Wray as singing freshman

Episodes

References

External links
 

1980s American sitcoms
1987 American television series debuts
1987 American television series endings
NBC original programming
Television shows set in New Jersey
English-language television shows
1980s American college television series
Television series by Universal Television